Floria may refer to:

 Floria, a village in Crete, Greece
 MS Floria, a former Finnish ferry
 Floria Capsali (1900–1982), an Ottoman-born Romanian ballerina and choreographer
 Floria, an extinct genus of hexacoral